Laurent Noël (March 19, 1920 – July 2, 2022) was a Canadian prelate of the Roman Catholic Church. He served as bishop of Diocese of Trois-Rivières from 1975 to 1996.

Life
Noël was born in Saint-Just-de-Bretenières, Quebec and was ordained a priest on June 16, 1944 for the Diocese of Sainte-Anne-de-la-Pocatière. He was appointed Auxiliary Bishop of the Archdiocese of Quebec on June 25, 1963 as well as titular bishop of Agathopolis, and was consecrated on August 29, 1963. He was the Apostolic Administrator Diocese of Hauterive from 1974 to 1975. Noël was appointed to the Diocese of Trois-Rivières on November 8, 1975, where he served until his retirement on November 21, 1996. Upon the death of Damián Iguacén Borau on November 24, 2020, he became the oldest living Catholic bishop. Upon the death of Remi De Roo on February 1, 2022, he became the last surviving Canadian bishop to participate in the Second Vatican Council.

References

External links
Catholic-Hierarchy

1920 births
2022 deaths
French Quebecers
20th-century Roman Catholic bishops in Canada
Participants in the Second Vatican Council
Canadian centenarians
Men centenarians
Academic staff of Université Laval
Roman Catholic bishops of Trois-Rivières
21st-century Roman Catholic bishops in Canada
Bishops appointed by Pope Paul VI